The Queen of Basketball is a 2021 American documentary short film by Ben Proudfoot about basketball legend Lusia Harris. It premiered at the Tribeca Film Festival on June 10, 2021 and won the Academy Award for Best Documentary (Short Subject).

Summary
Lusia Harris reflects on her time as a college basketball star, during which she and her team, Delta State University, won three national championships, and she won a silver medal with the United States women's national basketball team at the 1976 Summer Olympics. Her playing career ended after her graduation, as the WNBA would not be founded until 1996; she was offered the unique opportunity to try out for the New Orleans Jazz (later Utah Jazz) of the NBA, but turned it down, preferring to concentrate on raising a family. She would then return to Delta State University as head coach of their women's team.

Accolades

See also
Dear Basketball
 Cheryl Miller

References

External links

 
Official website
The New York Times video on YouTube

2021 short documentary films
2021 films
American short documentary films
Documentary films about basketball
African-American films
Best Documentary Short Subject Academy Award winners
Women's basketball in the United States
Documentary films about women's sports
Delta State University
American basketball films
2020s English-language films
2020s American films
Works originally published in The New York Times
Women's sports in Mississippi